Charles Morgan Kingston (December 27, 1867 – February 1, 1948) was a Canadian politician. He served in the Legislative Assembly of British Columbia from 1928 to 1933  from the electoral district of Grand Forks-Greenwood, as a Conservative. He was a doctor.

References

British Columbia Conservative Party MLAs
1867 births
1948 deaths